Kulshekar is a locality in Mangalore city, Karnataka, India. It lies on national highway 13 which connects Mangalore to Chitradurga. It is nearly 5 km from Mangalore central railway station. The Holy Cross Church is a Roman Catholic church situated at Cordel in Kulshekar.

References

External links
Mangalore City Corporation Website

Localities in Mangalore